Królowe  is a village located in the Opole Voivodeship (southern Poland), Głubczyce County, Gmina Głubczyce.

Monuments 
The following monuments are listed by the Narodowy Instytut Dziedzictwa.
 kościół par. pw. św. Wawrzyńca, z l. 1847–1849
 19th century Parish church.
 zagroda nr 10, z XIX w.
 Historic homestead from the 19th century.
 zagroda nr 33
 Historic homestead.
 zagroda nr 44
 Historic homestead.
 zagroda nr 55/57, XIX w.
 Historic homestead from the 19th century.
 zagroda nr 73
 Historic homestead.

Notable peoples 
Anton Froehlich (1860,Królowe–1931,Chorzów), Upper Silesian wholesale merchant, mill owner 'First Königshütte Steam Mill', chairman of the supervisory board of Śląski Bank Ludowy Królewsk Huta, G.-Śl., father of Silesian priest and martyr August Froehlich

See also
 Królowe Stojło

References

Villages in Głubczyce County